Christine Anne Jarvis (born 21 December 1949) is a British former international swimmer.

Swimming career
She competed at the 1972 Summer Olympics and the 1976 Summer Olympics.

She represented England and won a bronze medal in the 100 metres breaststroke, at the 1970 British Commonwealth Games in Edinburgh, Scotland. Four years later she competed in the breaststroke events at the 1974 British Commonwealth Games in Christchurch, New Zealand.

At the ASA National British Championships she won the 100 metres breaststroke title in 1972 and 1973

References

External links
 

1949 births
Living people
British female swimmers
Olympic swimmers of Great Britain
Swimmers at the 1972 Summer Olympics
Swimmers at the 1976 Summer Olympics
Place of birth missing (living people)
Swimmers at the 1970 British Commonwealth Games
Swimmers at the 1974 British Commonwealth Games
Commonwealth Games medallists in swimming
Commonwealth Games bronze medallists for England
Alabama Crimson Tide women's swimmers
Medallists at the 1970 British Commonwealth Games